Cathy Weseluck is a Canadian actress and comedian who frequently works with Ocean Productions in Vancouver, British Columbia and is known for her roles as Near in Death Note, Cybersix/Adrian Seidelman in Cybersix, and Spike in My Little Pony: Friendship is Magic.

Early life
Cathy Weseluck has Russian ancestry. Her relatives are from the Russian Empire or the Soviet Union (now territory Belarus).

Career

Radio
Before becoming a voice actress, Weseluck was an associate producer at CBC Radio until one of the hosts encouraged her to try voice acting. Her first voice work was a radio spot for the Vancouver Centre Mall.

Voice acting
Weseluck has provided voices for many cartoon and anime series. She has provided the voice of Mirai Yashima in Mobile Suit Gundam, Dorothy Catalonia and Catherine Bloom in Gundam Wing, Near in Death Note, Cybersix in Cybersix, Shampoo in Ranma , Kagome's mother in InuYasha, Verne in U.B.O.S., Misa Takatsuki in Project ARMS, and Kid Trunks, Chiaotzu, and Puar in Dragon Ball Z (among many others). She also voices Spike and several background characters in the animated children's series My Little Pony: Friendship Is Magic.

In addition to her voice-over work, she is also a voice director and instructor. She served as singing director on My Little Pony Tales, casting coordinator on Animated Classic Showcase for Film Roman, voice director for the English version of Spiff and Hercules, casting director on The Authentic Adventures of Professor Thompson and dubbing director on Billy the Cat.

Filmography

Web productions
 #TweetIt: Featuring My Little Pony Staff and Bronies – Herself

Anime dubbing
 B-Daman Fireblast – Riki Ryugasaki
 Beyblade Burst - Jin Aizawa
 Black Lagoon – Garcia Lovelace
 Dragon Ball Z (Ocean Dub) – Chaozu, Puar, East Kai, Young Trunks, Android 19, Chiko, Lemilia, Marron, Erasa, Bra
 Death Note – Near/Nate River, additional female voices
 Funky Fables – Various Characters
 Gintama° – Young Katsura Kotaro
 Hamtaro – Snoozer, Laura's Mom, Omar
 Hikaru no Go – Yuki Mitani, Hikaru's Mom
 Kurozuka – Saniwa
 MegaMan: NT Warrior - Kid Grave
 Mega Man: Upon a Star – Mrs. Kobayashi
 Mobile Suit Gundam and Mobile Suit Gundam: Char's Counterattack – Mirai Yashima
 Mobile Suit Gundam Wing – Catherine Bloom (35-49), Dorothy Catalonia
 Gundam Wing: Endless Waltz – Catherine Bloom (Movie Version only), Dorothy Catalonia
 Mobile Suit Gundam 00 – Kati Mannequin, Revive Revival
 Ghost in the Shell S.A.C. Individual Eleven – Tachikoma
 Ghost in the Shell S.A.C. Laughing Man – Tachikoma
 The Hakkenden – Shinbei Inue/Daihachi
 Hamtaro – Marian Haruna, Kylie's cousin Ethan, Snoozer, Omar, additional voices
 Inuyasha – Kagome's mother/Mrs. Higurashi, Ayumi, Additional voices
 Inuyasha: The Final Act - Kagome's mother/Mrs. Higurashi, Ayumi
 Let's Go Quintuplets – Harold
 Monkey Magic – Empress Dowager
 The New Adventures of Kimba The White Lion – Additional Voices
 Ogre Slayer – Setsuko
 Powerpuff Girls Z – Ken Utonium, Bubbles' Grandmother
 Project A-ko – C-ko Kotobuki
 Project ARMS – Misa
 Ranma ½ – Shampoo, Azusa Shiratori, Yuka, Additional Voices
 Shakugan no Shana – Khamsin Nbh'w (Season 1)
 Super Kid – Gokdari
 The Story of Saiunkoku – Court Lady 3, Lady, Lady of the Night 3, Ryushin
 Transformers: Armada – Boy at Carnival
 World Trigger – Yuma Kuga
 Yashahime: Princess Half-Demon - Mrs. Higurashi/Grammy

Live Action English Dubbing
 L Change The World - Kimiko Kujo/K

Animation
 1001 Nights – Shahzaman
 16 Hudson – Luc, TV Cook
 Aaagh! It's the Mr. Hell Show! – Additional Voices
 Adventures of Mowgli – Young Mowgli
 Lobo - Marco Van Helsing
 Animated Classic Showcase – Various characters
 A Very Fairy Christmas – Sandy Adams, Tracey Garcia
 Barbie: A Fashion Fairytale – Wicked Queen
 The Barbie Diaries – Principal Peters, Passing Girl 1
 Barbie: Fairytopia – Dizzle
 Barbie in the Nutcracker – Maid
 Barbie: Mariposa – Zinzee, Dizzle, Fairy Speck
 Barbie: Thumbelina – Janessa
 Barbie: Princess Charm School – Female Announcer, Keypad
 Barbie: Spy Squad – Aunt Zoe
 Being Ian – Evil Dutch Girls, Teenager, Hans' Sister
 Billy the Cat – Additional Voices
 BoBoiBoy – Ochobot
 Bratz: Girlz Really Rock – Ms. Higgins
 Camp Candy – Additional Voices
 Capertown Cops – Coco Loco
 Captain Zed and the Zee Zone – Additional Voices
 A Christmas Adventure... From a Book Called Wisely's Tales – Darryl, Kimberoo
 Class of the Titans – Envy
 Cosmic Quantum Ray  –  Mother Brainhead
 The Cramp Twins – Miss Hissy, Mrs. Winkle, Kid #2
 Cybersix – Cybersix (Adrian Seidelman)
 Dragon Tales – Miss Tree, Dragon Fairy, Yellow Puzzle Door
 Dreamkix – Roy, Henrietta, Alice
 Dr. Dimensionpants – Thora
 Edgar & Ellen – Judith, Mrs. Pimm
 Exosquad – Additional Voices
 Firehouse Tales – Milkie
 Generation O! – Chadd, Janine
 Holly and Hal Moose: Our Uplifting Christmas Adventure – Mrs. Claus
 Hurricanes – Additional Voices
 In Search of Santa – Emma, William, Wing Maiden #4, Wing Maiden #6
 Iron Man: Armored Adventures – Abigail Brand
 Johnny Test – Squirrely Girl
 Kid vs. Kat – Dennis
 A Kind of Magic – Mrs. Lumberg
 Kissyfur – Bessie the Goose (Recorded promo only)
 Kleo the Misfit Unicorn – Tara, Emily, Mrs. Piggott, Sami
 Krypto the Superdog – Additional Voices
 Lapitch the Little Shoemaker – Lapitch
 Littlest Pet Shop (1995) – Additional Voices
 Littlest Pet Shop (2012) – Buttercream Sundae, Judi Jo Jameson, Jane
 Lupo Alberto – Martha, Alice (season 1)
 Make Way for Noddy – Miss Pink Cat
 Martin Mystery – Additional voices
 Maryoku Yummy – Fij Fij, Baburu, Enro
 Mega Man – Doris, Robobeautician
 Molly of Denali — Charlotte (Episode: "The Night Manager")
 My Little Pony: Friendship Is Magic – Spike, Mayor Mare, Coco Pommel, miscellaneous voices
 My Little Pony: Equestria Girls – Spike
 My Little Pony: Equestria Girls – Rainbow Rocks – Spike
 My Little Pony: Equestria Girls – Friendship Games – Spike
 My Little Pony: Equestria Girls – Legend of Everfree – Spike
 My Little Pony: The Movie – Spike
 My Little Pony: Best Gift Ever – Spike
 My Little Pony: Rainbow Roadtrip – Spike
 My Little Pony: The Runaway Rainbow – Rarity the Unicorn, Ice Scoop
 Nilus the Sandman – Pearl the Talking Clam
 Ninjago: Masters of Spinjitzu – Real Estate Agent
 ReBoot – Backup
 Ricky Sprocket – Robot
 Robin and the Dreamweavers
 RoboCop: Alpha Commando – Additional Voices
 RollBots – Penny, Mayor Aria
 Roswell Conspiracies: Aliens, Myths and Legends – Additional Voices
 Rudolph the Red-Nosed Reindeer: The Movie – Sparkle the Sprite, Elf Crowd Member #1
 Sitting Ducks – Drill Sergeant Duck
 Spiff and Hercules – Additional Voices
 Stone Protectors – Empress Opal
 Storm Hawks – Ravess
 Superbook – Gizmo
 Super Trolls
 A Tale of Two Kitties – Spunky
 Tayo the Little Bus – Toni (Season 1–2)
 Team Galaxy – Fluffy
 Team Tonka – Scan
 The Adventures of Corduroy – Additional Voices
 The Deep – Hickman
 The Little Prince season 2 – Okoda (D 0101 > B 743 The Planet of the Crystal Tears) and The School Teacher (D 455 > W 5613 The Planet of the Astrotrainiacs)
 The New Adventures of He-Man – Teela
 The New Adventures of Lucky Luke – Big Bone Bear
 The Triplets – The Bored Witch (Season 1–2)
 Thor: Tales of Asgard – Brunhilde, Additional Voices
 ToddWorld – Tyler
 Tom and Jerry – Thomasina
 Troll Tales – Tumbler
 Ultimate Book of Spells – Vern, Borgia
 What About Mimi? – Additional Voices
 X-Men: Evolution – Dr. Eaton
 Yvon of the Yukon – Miss Anthrope

Live-action
 The Halfback of Notre Dame – Mrs. Modeau
 I'll Be Home for Christmas – Wendy Richards
 M.A.N.T.I.S. – T.V. Interviewer (episode: "First Steps"), Cindy Logan (episode: "Cease Fire")
 The Outer Limits – Simon (voice) (episode: "Simon Says")
 Resurrection – Hospital P.R. Woman (TV film)
 Stargate SG-1 – Resident #2 (episode: "The Gamekeeper")
 You, Me and the Kids – Bank's Assistant (episode: "Cents & Sensibility")

Video games
 Devil Kings – Hornet
 Kessen – Okatsu
 Mobile Suit Gundam: Encounters in Space – Mirai Yashima
 Mobile Suit Gundam: Gundam vs. Zeta Gundam – Mirai Yashima
 Mobile Suit Gundam: Journey to Jaburo – Mirai Yashima
 My Little Pony – Spike
 Victor Vector and Yondo the Dog in The Cyberplasm Formula – Various
 "Minecraft Mini Series: Challenge of The Spooky Isles" – Slugger
 Rudolph the Red-Nosed Reindeer's Magical Sleigh Ride – Rudolph

References

External links
 
 
 
 

Living people
Actresses from Vancouver
Canadian casting directors
Women casting directors
Canadian film actresses
Canadian impressionists (entertainers)
Canadian people of Russian descent
Canadian people of Belarusian descent
Canadian radio actresses
Canadian television actresses
Canadian video game actresses
Canadian voice actresses
Canadian voice directors
20th-century Canadian actresses
21st-century Canadian actresses
Year of birth missing (living people)